This is a list of Bosnian European Film Award winners and nominees. This list details the performances of Bosnian actors, actresses, and films that have either been submitted or nominated for, or have won, a European Film Award.

Main categories

Nominations - 8
Wins - 2

See also
 List of Bosnian submissions for the Academy Award for Best Foreign Language Film

External links
 Nominees and winners at the European Film Academy website

Bosnia and Herzegovina
European Film Awards